MetaJets is an animated television series produced by Cookie Jar Entertainment and Sunwoo Entertainment.

Broadcast
In Canada, MetaJets premiered on October 3, 2010 on Teletoon. In South Korea, this show was first aired on KBS1 on January 31, 2009, and it premiered on TF1 on October 7, 2009 in France. This show was also seen in other selected territories, such as on Cartoon Network on July 4, 2010 in the United States, Studio 23 on July 13, 2010 in the Philippines, and in 2011 it was shown on Clan in Spain as well as Disney Channel Asia. The entire first season was available to watch instantly on Netflix. In Canada it was offered from 2017-2018 via Kids Suite from Bell Satellite TV.

Characters
Major characters:

Metajets
Johnny Miller (강한결): Joined ARC tournament when George Strong invited him to be an ARC racer. During an unsanctioned race between Trey and Johnny at ground level slum, the match was interrupted by a Metajets summon. Johnny followed Trey's path into ARC-1 and discovered Trey, Maggie, Zak, George's Metajets connection. During Johnny's presence in ARC-1, An attack against ARC-1 was launched by General Raven. Johnny decided to leave ARC-1 and enter the battle. When Viper fired 2 missiles at Burner's jet, Johnny used his jet to take the hit for Burner. Following the battle, George recruited Johnny as Metajets agent.
 Code Name : Ace (에이스)
 15
 Voice actor: Jamie Haydon-Devlin

Trey Jordan (트레이): A Metajets agent and a champion ARC racer at the last season.
 Code Name: Burner (버너)
 16
 Voice Actor: Mpho Koaho

Maggie Strong (매기): An ARC racer, and George Strong's daughter.
 Code Name: Foxtrot (폭스트롯)
 15
 Voice Actress: Katie Griffin

Zachary Kim/Zak (잭): A top-10 ARC racer at the last season.
 Code Name: Vector (벡터)
 14
 Voice Actor: Scott McCord

Captain Strong (캡틴 스트롱)/George Strong: Chairman of ARC and Metajets leader.
 41
 Voice Actor: Ivan Sherry

Major/First Officer: A Metajets officer at ARC-1.
Technician: A Metajets officer at ARC-1.
Jack Miller: Johnny Miller's father. Following the previous Black Clouds war 9 years ago, Jack Miller has gone missing afterwards.
 Code Name: Ice Storm

Black Cloud
General Raven (레이븐 장군): Originally a top ARC racer, he received a lifetime ban from racing after sabotaging a competitor near a fatal crash. As a Black Cloud leader, he attempts to take revenge against Captain Strong and the ARC. After failing to convince Fly-Girl and Crusher to manually detonate bombs at Soaring Heights following a delay on bomb timer set by Zak, Raven was persuaded by Viper to fight against Metajets at the front line. In a Soaring Height ground duel against Ace, Ace fired at an undetonated missile behind Raven, triggering an explosion that freezes Raven. Following the final ARC race of the season, the frozen Raven was seen in a jar maintained by Dr. Lucas.
 Voice Actor: Steve Cumyn
Fly Girl/Fly-Girl (플라이걸): A Black Cloud fighter jet pilot.
 Voice Actress: Athena Karkanis
Crusher (크러셔): A Black Cloud fighter jet pilot.
 Voice Actor: David Berni
Viper (바이퍼): A Black Cloud fighter jet pilot.
 Voice Actor: Jonathan Koensgen
BC Tech: An officer at Black Cloud Airship.

Aerial Racing Circuit (ARC)
Announcer/Race Announcer: An announcer of ARC races.
 Voice Actor: Ron Pardo

World Council
World Council President: Leader of World Council. He has the authority to lock down Metajets weapon system remotely.

Others
Tory
Saul
Kai
Deb
Doug Fontaine
The Scarlet Circle
The Red Baroness
Tooler
other men
The AI
Griffen Hawksmore
Strong
Dr. Lucas

Vehicles

Metajets
Ace's Metajet: Originally belong to Johnny's father, George assigned the jet to Johnny when Johnny became a Metajets agent. It includes a liquid nitrogen-based weapon system.
Burner's Metajet: A jet with powerful laser cannons and afterburners.
Foxtrot's Metajet: A jet armed with solar rockets.
Vector's Metajet: A jet equipped with a sonic weapon.
ARC-1: A flagship for the ARC that houses the race pilots and their jets, while secretly acting as the home base for Metajets.

Black Cloud
Black Cloud Airship/Raven's Nest: A Black Cloud flagship.
Crusher’s Jet: A jet with wing-mounted buzzsaws.
Flygirl’s Jet: A jet armed with rapid-fire timed explosive darts.
Viper’s Jet: A jet with powerful homing missiles.
Raven’s Jet: General Raven’s personal jet, not much is known about its capabilities as he only uses it twice in the series.
Black Cloud Drone Jets: A massive swarm of drones that make up the bulk of Black Cloud’s fleet.

References

External links
Cookie Jar Entertainment page
Sunwoo Entertainment page: English, Korean
KBS page: Korean

2010s Canadian animated television series
Television series by Cookie Jar Entertainment
Aviation television series
Teletoon original programming
2010 Canadian television series debuts
2011 Canadian television series endings
Canadian children's animated action television series
Canadian children's animated adventure television series
Canadian children's animated fantasy television series
South Korean children's animated action television series
South Korean children's animated adventure television series
South Korean children's animated fantasy television series
Anime-influenced Western animated television series
Teen animated television series